The Orange Isle Bridge is an arch bridge over the Xiang River in Changsha, Hunan, China. It connects Yuelu District and Furong District.

History
In May 1971, the former Ministry of Communications approved the  Changsha Municipal People's Government to build a bridge between Yuelu District and Furong District. On September 6, the construction of Orange Isle Bridge was started, at that time it was called "Changsha Xiang River Bridge".

In March 1972, the construction team built 18 piers of the bridge. On September 30 of the same year, the bridge was completed and opened to traffic.

In January 2006, it was renamed "Orange Isle Bridge".

References

Bridges in Changsha
Arch bridges in China
Bridges completed in 1972
Buildings and structures completed in 1972
1972 establishments in China